The 2013–14 Leinster Senior Cup, was the 113th staging of the Leinster Senior Cup association football competition.

31 teams entered the 2013–14 competition including the 11 Leinster based League of Ireland teams who entered the competition at the Fourth round stage. A further 5 Intermediate teams and 15 Junior teams entered the competition at the First, Second and Third Round stage.

Shamrock Rovers were the defending champions. The previous season's runners up, St Patrick's Athletic won the tournament in 2014, beating Longford Town 2–1 in the final at City Calling Stadium on 9 September 2014.

First round
14 Junior clubs were entered into this round by a draw. Byes were given to 6 of these clubs. Winners progress to the Second Round.

Second round
The 6 Junior clubs who received byes in Round One play against the 4 Round One winners.

 Abandoned after 79:43 minutes due to floodlight failure.

Third round
5 Intermediate clubs entered in this round in an open draw along with the 5 Second Round winners.

Fourth round
The 11 Leinster based League of Ireland clubs enter in this round in an open draw along with the 5 Third Round winners.

Quarter-final

Semi-final

Final

References

External links
 Official website
 Irish Amateur Soccer videos, news and social network

Leinster Senior Cup (association football)
4
4